Taviche may refer to:

San Jerónimo Taviche
San Pedro Taviche
Taviche silver-gold project at Minaurum Gold